The Gaunt factor (or Kramers–Gaunt factor) is used as a multiplicative correction to the continuous absorption or emission results when calculated using classical physics techniques. In cases where classical physics provides a close approximation, the Gaunt factor can be set to 1.0. It varies from this value in cases where quantum mechanics becomes important.

The Gaunt factor was named after the physicist John Arthur Gaunt, based on his work on the quantum mechanics of continuous absorption. Gaunt used
a 'g' function in his 1930 work, which Chandrasekhar named the 'Gaunt factor' in 1939. It is sometimes named the Kramers-Gaunt factor as Gaunt incorporated the work of Hendrik Anthony Kramers.

See also
 Kramers' opacity law

References

Further reading
 

Scattering, absorption and radiative transfer (optics)